is a Japanese science fiction manga series written and illustrated by Hitoshi Ashinano. It was serialized in Kodansha's Monthly Afternoon magazine from June 1994 to February 2006, with a concluding postscript episode in July 2006, and collected in 14 tankōbon volumes. Parts of the story were adapted as two original video animation (OVA) anime series of two episodes each, where the latter one is titled Quiet Country Cafe.

The series depicts the daily life of an android who runs a coffee shop some time after the Earth's ecology has collapsed. It is noted for its spare pen-and-ink drawing style, as well as its calm, meticulously paced stories and engaging characters. Yokohama Kaidashi Kikō won the 2007 Seiun Award for best science-fiction comic.

Plot
Yokohama Kaidashi Kikō is set in a peaceful, post-cataclysmic world where mankind is in decline after an environmental disaster. Exactly what happened is never explained, but sea levels have risen significantly, inundating coastal cities such as Yokohama, Mount Fuji erupted in living memory, and climate change has occurred. With the seasons being less pronounced, the winters are milder and the summer isn't scorching anymore. The reduced human population has reverted to a simpler life, and the reader is told this is the twilight of the human age. One scene depicts an anti-aircraft missile being used in a firework display. Instead of raging against their fate, humans have quietly accepted it.

Alpha Hatsuseno is an android ("robot person") who runs an out-of-the-way coffee shop, Café Alpha, on the lonely coast of the Miura Peninsula of Japan, while her human "owner" is on a trip of indefinite length. Though she spends much of her time alone, Alpha is cheerful, gregarious, and—unlike the slowly declining humans—immortal.

Most chapters of Yokohama Kaidashi Kikō are self-contained slice-of-life episodes depicting Alpha in daily activities, either alone, with customers, or on occasional trips through the countryside or into Yokohama for supplies (whence the "shopping log" of the title came). Whole chapters are devoted to brewing coffee, taking photographs, or repairing a tiny model aircraft engine, sometimes with only a few lines of dialogue. Through Alpha's experiences, the author brings out the small wonders of everyday life and makes the reader aware of their passing: the aircraft engine runs out of fuel; her scooter breaks down; the rising ocean encroaches on her coffee shop; the neighborhood children she loves grow up and move away. In evoking a nostalgia for this loss, Ashinano follows the Japanese tradition of mono no aware (sadness for the transience of things).

Though often self-contained, the stories have continuity—relationships grow and change, and seemingly insignificant details reappear later. Ashinano explains few details of Alpha's world, leaving mysteries that engage the reader as the series unfolds in a meandering progression, by turns funny, touching, and nostalgic.

Characters

A type A7M2 robot, one of only three production prototypes, who runs Café Alpha in the absence of her owner (whose family name is Hatsuseno). Alpha is cheerful and thoughtful. She enjoys talking with her few customers, but is initially socially awkward and sheltered—despite being her model's prototype, at the start of the series she has met only a few people and no other robots. Because of this, when her owner departed, she declined to travel with him. As the series progresses, however, she grows more confident in her social skills, enough so that she spends a year traveling herself, and becomes more attached to her human friends even as they age and depart. Alpha is not very experienced about human behavior or appearances, she uses dishwasher liquid instead of brushing her teeth and doesn't think of her eye or hair color being strange. One of her unique abilities is that she is, according to her emotions, able to induce tears in her eye moisturizers. In her spare time, Alpha plays a gekkin, carves small art objects with fish designs, and travels the local countryside on her scooter, investigating the remains of humanity's previous age and the emerging world to come.

A type A7M3 production robot who works as a courier in what remains of Musashino, Tokyo. She is the first robot that Alpha meets, when she delivers a package (containing a camera) and a message from Alpha's owner. They soon become friends. Kokone is sweet, shy, and somewhat intellectual, but because of her job she has more experience with people than Alpha, and can sometimes pass for human. After meeting Alpha, her "older sister" production-wise, Kokone becomes curious about the history and nature of robots. Unlike Alpha, she is able to process animal protein.

A middle-aged man with a perpetual grin, he is Alpha's closest neighbor and a regular customer at her café. He runs a gas station and sells vegetables on the side. He is a grandfather-figure to Alpha and the actual grandfather of Takahiro. Ojisan refers to himself as a bum, and seems to regret not pursuing a relationship with Sensei when they were younger. His real name is never given.
 
An older woman, she is a doctor for both humans and androids. She was involved in the creation of the A7 series of robots, and hosted Director Alpha in her home, possibly as Director Alpha's owner. When she was younger, she rode motorcycles and raced hovercraft, and was Ojisan's senpai from school. She tells Kokone that she is also involved in creation of Misago.

The grandson of Ojisan, who lives with his grandparents. He meets Alpha at age nine, and she quickly takes to him as if he were a younger brother. He is the first character in the series to meet the Misago. As he grows up, Takahiro becomes fascinated with engines of all types and eventually moves away in his mid-teens to work for Nai.

A girl a few years younger than Takahiro. She likes Takahiro and is initially jealous of Alpha. Makki eventually becomes close to Alpha after learning the latter would never consider having a relationship with Takahiro because mortal humans move through time in a different way than immortal robots. She is skeptical of Takahiro's stories of the Misago until she meets the wild-woman herself. In her early teens, Makki works for a while at Alpha's café, before moving away to become a courier with Kokone's company, and then later to Hamamatsu to be with Takahiro.

An ageless wild-woman who lives in the inlets and bays near Café Alpha. She is always naked, and eats raw fish, crabs and insects caught using her short fangs and inhuman speed which enables her to run on water and easily jump 10 metres high. She only shows herself to young children, and shies away from contact with adults. She does not age and, according to omake material, does not understand how children grow up. While Ayase claims she existed "decades before" robots were created, it is later implied by Doctor that she is the first robot. Despite Misago's feral nature, she is a gentle person, and does not cause harm to anyone beyond accidentally scaring some of the children she encounters.
Ayase
A wanderer who travels endlessly, relying on his kamas (a large predatory flying fish) to live off the land. He likes to see the curiosities of the world, and is especially fascinated by the Misago after an encounter with her as a child. Because of Makki's affinity for the Misago and his kamas, he tries to convince her to travel with him as a sort of protégé.
Director Alpha
The A7M1 prototype of the A7 series, and thus "older sister" to the other A7 robots. Like Alpha Hatsuseno, Director Alpha acquired her given name because she is the initial model, or "alpha-type", of a robot series. She is the director of a stratospheric aircraft called Taapon that circles the Earth without landing, observing the world's changes from above without ever being able to leave. Her surname is Koumi'ishi, the same as Sensei, and she has a pendant with Sensei's logo, indicating a past with her that is never elaborated on, and she never interacts with any of the other major characters.

A type A7M3 robot with a prickly personality. She is an artist who lives in Yokohama and works as a waitress and then shopclerk as a day job. She is unusual among robots for having changed her surname to one of her own choosing rather than adopting her owner's. Her given name is pronounced the same as her surname, but spelled in katakana. She likes Kokone and is jealous of Alpha for "taking" her. Nai sometimes sends her sensory impressions, delivered by Kokone, which she uses in her art.
Nai
An A7 robot of unknown model. He is unusual because for unknown reasons the majority of male robots rarely survive for very long after activation. He runs a delivery service, flying an AT-6 Texan aircraft. Nai is quiet and impassive.
Saetta
The young daughter of Makki and Takahiro. She is the last character to meet the Misago.

Anime voice cast

Influences and themes
Flying and flight recurs through the series. Alpha herself has repeated visions of flying. Planes that appear include Nai's airplane, the always-flying Taapon, and the model airplane engine that Alpha finds but never flies. The A7 series of robots is named after a Japanese World War II warplane Mitsubishi A7M that never saw production, and the character Saetta's name may be inspired by an Italian World War II warplane built by Aeronautica Macchi. Takahiro leaves ("flies away") to work for Nai. Ayase's kamas is a kind of flying fish. In the postscript episode, the unnamed character travels by glider. 

The series contains elements of Chinese culture and mythology. Alpha's gekkin  guitar is of Chinese origin, and the Taapon aircraft is named after the mythological bird Peng (taapon is the Japanese transliteration of da peng).

Some character names appear in the geography of the Yokohama area. For example, there is a bus stop named Koumi'ishi to the south of Hayama, and Atsugi airfield, where Alpha meets Nai, is located in Ayase. There is a place called Maruko in Yokohama where Maruko's gallery is supposed to be.

That several details of Yokohama Kaidashi Kikō are left unexplained, or have answers only hinted at, is frequently mentioned in reviews of the series as contributing to a tone of mystery. Some are mysteries to the characters, which they speculate about without reaching conclusions, while others are presented to the reader without comment. Among the most prominent are: 

 What is the nature of the natural disaster that caused the world's oceans to rise?
 Who is Alpha's owner, and where did he go? Why does Ayase call him "sensei"?
 Why were robots created? Since none are slaves or servants, what is their purpose? In what sense are they, as Kokone claims, humanity's children?
 Why are the humans in Alpha's world dying out?
 Why are male robots so rare?
 Why is Alpha, unlike other robots, allergic to animal proteins?
 What are the "water gods", strangely beautiful mushrooms with human faces, that have started growing in the wilds?
 Why have trees that mimic streetlamps and fungi that mimic buildings begun growing? Are they really, as Alpha and Ayase speculate, the "recollections of people that the earth remembers"?
 When was the eruption that removed Mount Fuji's top, and was it related to the ocean rise?
 What is the Misago? Why does she only show herself to children, and why is she unable to comprehend that they become adults? If, as Ayase claims, she is not a robot, then what is she?

Comparisons have been made between Yokohama Kaidashi Kikō and Aria, noting that they are both quiet slice-of-life stories in a futuristic setting with a similar emotional effect. A reviewer at Uknighted Manganime wrote, "What the two have in common, though, is a bright look at the future and a generally optimistic view of humanity, despite our failings."

Media

Manga
A total of 140 chapters were published in Japan by Kodansha in the seinen (aimed at younger adult men) manga magazine Monthly Afternoon between June 1994 to February 2006. The serial chapters were collected in 14 tankōbon volumes by Kodansha under the Afternoon KC imprint. In Q4 of 2009 Kodansha started a reprint of the tankōbon volumes. It is licensed in Korea under the title  (Café Alpha), in Indonesia by M&C Comics, in Taiwan by Tong Li Publishing, in France by  under the title , and in North America by Seven Seas Entertainment.

First edition

Second edition

In addition, a six-page postscript episode was published in the July 2006 issue of Afternoon. Titled "Touge" ("Mountain Pass"), this story does not have a chapter number and was not included in the original collection, though it is included in volume 10 of the re-release.

A postcard book with art from the manga was published on 24 September 1997, and an artbook was published on 20 March 2003.

Anime
Parts of the manga have been dramatized in two original video animation (OVA) anime series of two episodes each, where the latter one is titled Quiet Country Cafe. In both series, Alpha is voiced by Hekiru Shiina and Kokone by Akiko Nakagawa.

 The first OVA series, produced by Ajia-do Animation Works and directed by Takashi Annō, was released in May 1998 and December 1998 on VHS and Laserdisc. It dramatizes selected events from volumes 1–3, including the initial meeting of Alpha and Kokone and Alpha's recovery from being struck by lightning. It was subsequently rereleased on DVD. 
 The second series, produced by Ajia-do Animation Works and SME Visual Works and directed by Tomomi Mochizuki, was released in December 2002 and May 2003 on VHS and DVD. It dramatizes selected events from volumes 7–9, including the storm that destroys Alpha's cafe and her subsequent journeys in central Japan.

A soundtrack CD for the second series was produced in 1998.

Drama CDs
Three drama CDs of Yokohama Kaidashi Kikō were released in 2002. In all three, Alpha is voiced by Hekiru Shiina and Kokone by Akiko Nakagawa. 

 Volume 1 (released October 2002) dramatizes events from volume 1 of the manga, ending with the meeting of Alpha and Kokone.
 Volume 2 (released October 2002) dramatizes events from volume 2 of the manga, picking up immediately from where the first CD ended.
 Volume 3 (released December 2002) dramatizes events from later in the manga. It included an original song and an interview with Shiina and Nakagawa.

Novel
Set long after the conclusion of the manga series, it tells the story of a boy robot named Omega and his search for the legendary Cafe Alpha.

Reception and awards
Even though it has not been published in English until they began releasing the second edition releases in 2022, Yokohama Kaidashi Kikō has received significant attention from reviewers outside Japan. Many reviewers praise Ashinano's drawing style, meticulous pacing, and engaging characters. Dirk Deppey wrote in The Comics Journal, "Yokohama Kaidashi Kikou isn't just one of my favorite manga stories; it's one of my favorite comics, period." Derik A. Badman wrote, "This is light years beyond almost all the manga being translated and published in the US." A reviewer at Uknighted Manganime wrote, "Artwise, Yokohama Kaidashi Kikou ranks as the most impressive I have ever seen," adding, "Yokohama Kaidashi Kikou is, in short, the finest manga I have ever read, and I don’t see it being surpassed anytime soon, if ever." 

The series won the 2007 Seiun Award for Best Manga.

Notes

References

External links
 Kodansha Comic Plus
 Yokohama Kaidashi Kikou DVD official homepage
 Ashinano Hitoshi at The Ultimate Manga Guide
 "Behind the Panels" of Yokohama Kaidashi Kikou
 

1994 manga
1998 anime OVAs
2002 anime OVAs
Ajia-do Animation Works
Aniplex
Iyashikei anime and manga
Kodansha manga
Post-apocalyptic anime and manga
Seinen manga
Seven Seas Entertainment titles